Dictyota is a genus of brown seaweed in the family Dictyotaceae. Species are predominantly found in tropical and subtropical seas, and are known to contain numerous chemicals (diterpenes) which have potential medicinal value. As at the end of 2017, some 237 different diterpenes had been identified from across the genus.

Taxonomy and Nomenclature 
The genus Dictyota was first described by Jean Vincent Lamouroux in 1809.  The name Dictyota is derived from the Greek word “Διχτυον” meaning “net” or “network”, referring to the inner cellular structure of specimens when viewed under a microscope, which features netted cortical and medullary cells.

Dictyota belongs to the order Dictyotales and the SSDO-clade, which also includes the orders Sphacelariales, Syringodermatales, and Onslowiales. The family Dictyotaceae is divided into two tribes: Dictyoteae and Zonarieae. The former have a single lens-shaped apical cell from which the thallus grows, while the latter are characterized by a row or cluster of apical cells.  The genera Glossophora, Glossophorella, and Pachdictyon are synonyms of Dictyota as DNA sequencing revealed that they were closely related.

Morphology

External characteristics 
Dictyota has "flat, ribbon-like axes" which exhibit dichotomous branching that may be either isotomous (equal or symmetrical) or anisotomous (unequal). Isotomous branches may be recurved, while anisotomous branches may become falcate (hooked), or cervicorn, if combined with twisting axes. Apical meristems of Dictyota species have been reported to be either truncate, rounded, or acute. A considerable degree of morphological plasticity has been observed from branching patterns, thus making molecular analyses indispensable when identifying species.

Colors of living thalli range from dark brown to green (as in D. friabilis) or blue (as in D. cyanoloma).  The thalli grow from apical cells which differentiate into an outer cortical and an inner medullary cell layer. Cortical cells on the margins of the thalli may grow into leaf-like projections or teeth (as in D. ciliolata and D. cyanoloma) while adventitious branches may grow from the central cortical cells. Thalli may also grow hair (20-50 um in diameter). Thalli attach to the substrate via rhizoids which are multicellular, uniseriate, branching, and hyaline (glassy or transparent). Different species may have one or several attachment points which can lead to a wide range of growth forms (i.e. creeping thalli or fully erect).

Internal anatomy 
The thalli are parenchymatous and are characterized by one or more apical cells that divide into an outer cortical and an inner medullary cell layer which can have several different configurations (e.g. uni-layered cortex with unilayered medulla, uni-layered cortex with multi-layered medulla, etc.).

Distribution 
Dictyota is distributed along tropical to temperate waters with species having generally restricted geographic ranges. It is the most abundant genus of brown algae in the Mediterranean Sea as well as the Atlantic coasts of Europe.

Ecology 
Species of the genus are commonly found in subtidal to intertidal rocky pools. Seasonality in species' abundances as well as fertility are driven mainly by temperature, photoperiod, and solar radiation. For instance, populations of D. dichotoma in the southern hemisphere are highly abundant for a majority of the year but are largely absent in the warmer months, which is when its northern counterparts are most abundant and fertile.

Life History 
Dictyota exhibits an isomorphic life cycle wherein the alternating gametophyte and sporophyte phases appear morphologically similar. This alternation co-occurs with a change in ploidy. The gametophytes produce gametes which undergo fertilization to produce the diploid sporophyte, which then produces sporangia which will release 4 haploid spores through meiosis. Half of the haploid spores will develop into the female gametophytes while the other half will develop into male gametophytes, starting the process over again.

Dictyota is dioecious and reproduces both sexually and asexually. Release of gametes follows a diurnal and lunar periodicity. Gametes are often released 20–30 minutes after first light, with peaks occurring once or twice a month depending on the species. Asexual reproduction may occur via adventitious branching following the loss of the apical meristem.

Chemical Composition 
Dictyota is known to have high levels of fatty acids and lipids which makes the genus ideal for use as feedstock. The pigments found in Dictyota are Chlorophyll a, c, fucoxanthin and violaxanthin which are present in a ratio of 13:3:10:1. This ratio may be altered by depth.

Exploitation/Utilization and Management 
The genus is not currently cultivated nor harvested on an industrial scale. It is mainly exploited for its secondary metabolites which are known to have anticoagulant, antibacterial, anti-inflammatory properties, among others, making them useful for a wide range of pharmaceutical applications.  For instance, there is evidence that methanolic extracts of Dictyota inhibits the butyrylcholinesterase (BuChE) enzyme in humans, which could potentially treat Alzheimer's disease.

Other applications include its use as biofuel - due to the high lipid content of some species - and as supplemental feeds for poultry, cattle, and fish.  A study in 2014 found that feeds with D. bartayresiana supplements could potentially reduce in vitro methane production of ruminants by 92.2%, which may have implications for reducing emissions from the agricultural sector.

Species 

The genus Dictyota contains the following species:

Dictyota acutiloba J.Agardh, 1848
Dictyota adhaerens Noda, 1965
Dictyota adnata Zanardini, 1878
Dictyota adnata f. nana Post
Dictyota aegerrima (Allender & Kraft) De Clerck, 2006
Dictyota alternifida J.Agardh, 1894
Dictyota anastomosans Steen et al.
Dictyota apiculata var. Agardh Weber-van Bosse
Dictyota asiatica I.K.Hwang
Dictyota attenuata P.Crouan & H.Crouan, 1842
Dictyota bartayresiana J.V.Lamouroux, 1809
Dictyota bartayresiana var. divaricata Kützing
Dictyota bifurca J.Agardh, 1894
Dictyota binghamiae J.Agardh, 1894
Dictyota canaliculata O.De Clerck & E.Coppejans, 1997
Dictyota canariensis (Grunow) Tronholm, 2013
Dictyota caribaea Hörnig & Schnetter, 1992
Dictyota cervicornis f. pseudodichotoma Taylor
Dictyota cervicornis f. spiralis Taylor<ref name="AB" 
Dictyota ceylanica var. anastomosans Yamada
Dictyota chalchicueyecanensis Lozano-Orozco & Sentíes
Dictyota ciliata var. humilis Grunow
Dictyota ciliolata Sonder ex Kützing, 1859
Dictyota concrescens W.R.Taylor, 1945
Dictyota coriacea (Holmes) I.K.Wang, H.-S.Kim & W.J.Lee, 2004
Dictyota crenulata J.Agardh, 1847
Dictyota cribrosa Setchell & N.L.Gardner, 1930
Dictyota crinita (J.Agardh) Hörnig, Schnetter & Prud'Homme van Reine, 1992
Dictyota crux 
Dictyota crux f. parva A.Bachmann
Dictyota cuneata Dickie, 1874
Dictyota cyanoloma Tronholm, De Clerck, A.Gómez-Garreta & Rull Lluch, 2010
Dictyota cymatophila Tronholm, M.Sanson & Afonso-Carrillo, 2010
Dictyota decumbens (R.W.Ricker) Hörnig, Schnetter & Prud'homme van Reine, 1992
Dictyota detergenda Kraft, 2009
Dictyota dhofarensis (Nizamuddin & A.C.Campbell) De Clerck, 2006
Dictyota dichotoma (Hudson) J.V.Lamouroux, 1809
Dictyota dichotoma Suhr, 1839
Dictyota dichotoma f. angustior Schiffner
Dictyota dichotoma var. fimbriata Piccone & Grunow
Dictyota dichotoma var. genuina Grunow
Dictyota dichotoma var. guinea Grunow
Dictyota dichotoma var. inequalis S.F.Gray
Dictyota dichotoma var. intricata (C.Agardh) Greville
Dictyota dichotoma var. patens 
Dictyota dichotoma f. proliferans Ercegovic
Dictyota diemensis Sonder ex Kützing, 1859
Dictyota dilatata Yamada, 1925
Dictyota divaricata P.L.Crouan & H.M.Crouan, 1865
Dictyota dolabellana De Paula, Yoneshigue-Valentin & Teixeira, 2008
Dictyota dumosa Børgesen, 1935
Dictyota fasciculata Sperk, 1869
Dictyota fascida J.Agardh, 1898
Dictyota fasciola var. abyssinica J.Agardh
Dictyota fasciola (Roth) J.V.Lamouroux, 1809
Dictyota fasciola var. divergens f. major Schiffner
Dictyota fasciola var. divergens f. minor Schiffner
Dictyota fasciola var. elongata De Notaris
Dictyota fasciola f. major Schiffner
Dictyota fasciola f. minor Schiffner
Dictyota fasciola var. repens (J.Agardh) Ardissone
Dictyota fastigiata Sonder, 1845
Dictyota fenestrata J.Agardh, 1894
Dictyota flabellata (F.S.Collins) Setchell & N.L.Gardner, 1924
Dictyota flabellulata Foster & Schiel
Dictyota flagellifera Kraft, 2009
Dictyota foliosa J.Agardh, 1892
Dictyota friabilis Setchell, 1926
Dictyota furcellata (C.Agardh) Greville, 1830
Dictyota galapagensis (Farlow) De Clerck, 2006
Dictyota grossedentata De Clerck & Coppejans, 1999
Dictyota guajirae Hörnig, Schnetter & J.M.Over, 1992
Dictyota guineënsis (Kützing) P.L.Crouan & H.M.Crouan, 1878
Dictyota gunniana (J.Agardh) I.Hörnig, R.Schnetter & Prud'homme van Reine, 1992
Dictyota hamifera Setchell, 1926
Dictyota harveyana 
Dictyota hauckiana Nizamuddin, 1975
Dictyota humifusa Hörnig, Schnetter & Coppejans, 1992
Dictyota implexa (Desfontaines) J.V.Lamouroux, 1809
Dictyota indica Anand, 1965
Dictyota inscripta J.Agardh, 1893
Dictyota intermedia Zanardini, 1874
Dictyota jamaicensis W.R.Taylor, 1960
Dictyota kunthii (C.Agardh) Greville, 1830
Dictyota laciniata J.V.Lamouroux, 1809
Dictyota lata J.V.Lamouroux, 1809
Dictyota linearis var. campsosticha Montagne
Dictyota linearis f. intricata Kützing
Dictyota linearis var. major P.Crouan & H.Crouan
Dictyota linearis var. minor Sonder
Dictyota littoralis P.Anand, 1965
Dictyota liturata J.Agardh, 1848
Dictyota major W.R.Taylor, 1945
Dictyota masonii Setchell & N.L.Gardner, 1930
Dictyota mayae Lozano-Orozco & Sentíes
Dictyota mediterranea (Schiffner) G.Furnari, 1997
Dictyota menstrualis (Hoyt) Schnetter, Hörnig & Weber-Peukert, 1987
Dictyota mertensii (C.Martius) Kützing, 1859
Dictyota moniliformis (J.Agardh) Hörnig, Schnetter & Prud'homme van Reine, 1992
Dictyota multifida (J.E.Smith) Bory, 1838
Dictyota naevosa (Suhr) Montagne, 1840
Dictyota nigrescens Zanardini, 1878
Dictyota nigricans J.Agardh, 1882
Dictyota ocellata J.Agardh, 1894
Dictyota pachyderma Luan Rixiao & Ding Lanping
Dictyota paniculata J.Agardh, 1841
Dictyota papenfussii Lindauer, 1949
Dictyota pavonia var. maxima J.V.Lamouroux
Dictyota pedrochei Lozano-Orozco & Sentíes
Dictyota pellucida J.Agardh, 1892
Dictyota penicellata J.V.Lamouroux
Dictyota phlyctaenodes Montagne, 1852
Dictyota pinnata (E.Y.Dawson) I.Hörnig, R.Schnetter & Prud'homme van Reine, 1993
Dictyota pinnatifida Kützing, 1859
Dictyota pinnatifida var. rigida Grunow
Dictyota plantaginea J.V.Lamouroux ex Frauenfeld, 1855
Dictyota plectens (Allender & Kraft) Kraft, 2009
Dictyota pleiacantha Tronholm, 2013
Dictyota polyclada Sonder ex Kützing
Dictyota pontica Sperk, 1869
Dictyota pulchella Hörnig & Schnetter, 1988>
Dictyota rhizodes (Turner) J.V.Lamouroux
Dictyota rigida De Clerck & Coppejans, 1999
Dictyota robusta J.Agardh, 1894
Dictyota rotunda C.Agardh, 1820
Dictyota sandvicensis Sonder, 1859
Dictyota serrulata J.V.Lamouroux, 1809
Dictyota spathulata Yamada, 1928
Dictyota spinulosa J.D.Hooker & Arnott, 1838
Dictyota spiralis Montagne, 1846
Dictyota stolonifera E.Y.Dawson, 1962
Dictyota suhrii (Kützing) I.Hörnig, R.Schnetter & W.F.Prud'homme van Reine, 1992
Dictyota vieillardii Kützing, 1863
Dictyota vieillardii var. filiformis Kützing
Dictyota virellus Noda, 1971
Dictyota vittata Kraft, 2009
Dictyota vivesii M.A.Howe, 1911

References

Dictyotaceae
Brown algae genera
Seaweeds